Teletex was ITU-T specification F.200 for a text and document communications service that could be provided over telephone lines. It was rapidly superseded by e-mail but the name Teletex lives on in several of the X.500 standard attributes used in Lightweight Directory Access Protocol.

Overview
Teletex was designed as an upgrade to the conventional telex service. The terminal-to-terminal communication service of telex would be turned into an  office-to-office document transmission system by teletex. Teletex envisaged direct communication between electronic typewriters, word processors and personal computers. These units had storage for transmitting and receiving messages. The use of such equipment considerably enhanced the character set available for document preparation.

Features

Character sets
In addition to the standard character set, a rich set of graphic symbols and a comprehensive set of control characters were supported in teletex. The set of control characters helped in preparation and reproduction of documents. In particular, they permitted the positioning of the printing element, specification of page orientation, left and right margins, vertical spacing and the use of underlining. The page control feature allowed standard A4 size papers to be used for receiving messages instead of the continuous stationery used in conventional telex systems.

Transmission and reception
A background/foreground operation was envisaged in teletex. Transmission/reception of messages should proceed in the background without affecting the work which the user might be carrying out in the foreground with the equipment. In other words, a user might be preparing a new document, while another document was being transmitted or  received. The teletex would also maintain compatibility with the present telex system and inter-operate with it. Telex procedures called for the exchange of header information before the actual document transfer took place. The header information consisted of four parts:

 Part 1: Destination ID,
 Part 2: Originator ID,
 Part 3: Date and time stamp,
 Part 4: Document reference.

Twenty four characters were used for source/destination ids, 14 characters for date and time stamp, and 7 characters for document reference which also specified the number of pages in the document. Destination/source ID consisted of four fields:

 Field 1: Country/Network code,
 Field 2: National subscriber number,
 Field 3: Reserved for future use,
 Field 4: Terminal/Owner code.

The number of characters allotted to each of the above fields was variable, subject to a maximum for each field, the total being 24 characters.

References

Legacy systems
Telegraphy